Postman Pat is a British stop-motion animated television series first produced by Woodland Animations. The series follows the adventures of Pat Clifton, a postman who works for Royal Mail postal service in the fictional village of Greendale (inspired by the real valley of Longsleddale in Cumbria).

Postman Pat'''s first 13-episode season was screened on BBC1 during 1981 and 1982. John Cunliffe wrote the original treatment and scripts, and was directed by animator Ivor Wood, who also worked on The Magic Roundabout, Paddington, and The Herbs. Following the success of the first season, and that of several subsequent television specials, a second season of 13 episodes was produced by the same crew in 1996. Here, Pat has a family for the first time. A new version of the series has been produced by Cosgrove Hall from November 2003, which expanded on many aspects of the original series. 

Series overview

Episodes
The episode number follows the first broadcast order.
Series 1 (1981–1982)

Series 2 (1997)

Series 3 (2004)

Series 4 (2006)

Series 5 (2007)

Special Delivery Service episodes

Series 6 (2008)
This is the first season of Postman Pat: Special Delivery Service.

Series 7 (2013)
This is the second season of Postman Pat: Special Delivery Service.

Series 8 (2016–2017)
This is the third and final season of Postman Pat: Special Delivery Service''.

Specials (1990–2006)

References

External links
 
 
 Postman Pat episode guide, TV Guide
 Postman Pat Special Delivery Service, OVGuide

Lists of British animated television series episodes
Lists of British children's television series episodes